Bile  (Bille) is one of the few Bantu languages of Nigeria. They can be found domiciled in Adamawa state below the Benue river opposite the Mbula-Bwazza who speak a related Bantu zone A (A60+40b) language.

References

Jarawan languages
Languages of Nigeria